Minuscule 383 (in the Gregory-Aland numbering), α 353 (Soden), is a Greek minuscule manuscript of the New Testament, on parchment. Paleographically it has been assigned to the 13th century.

Formerly it was labelled by 58a and 224p.

Description 

The codex contains the text of the Acts, Catholic epistles, and Pauline epistles on 181 parchment leaves with lacunae (Hebrews 13:7-25). The text is written in one column per page, in 24-28 lines per page.

Folio 182, bound with the codex, contains the text of lectionary 922.

Text 

The Greek text of the codex is a representative of the Western text-type in Acts of the Apostles. In rest of books it represents the Alexandrian text-type.

Kurt Aland did not place it in any Category.

History 

The manuscript was examined by Wettstein, Gaisford, Scholz, and Pott. Codex 58a of Wettstein is the same as 22a. C. R. Gregory saw it in 1883.

The manuscript was added to the list of the New Testament manuscripts by Scholz (1794-1852).

Formerly it was labelled by 58a and 224p. In 1908 Gregory gave the number 383 to it.

The manuscript is currently housed at the Bodleian Library in Oxford (MS. E. D. Clarke 9, fols. 1-181).

See also 

 List of New Testament minuscules
 Biblical manuscript
 Textual criticism

References

Further reading 

 August Pott, Der abendländische Text der Apostelgeschichte und die Wir-Quelle, Leipzig 1900, p. 78-88.
 A. V. Valentine-Richards, The Text of Acts in Codex 614 (Tisch 137) and its Allies (Cambridge, 1934).

External links 
 
 Minuscule 383 at the Encyclopedia of Textual Criticism

Greek New Testament minuscules
13th-century biblical manuscripts